The 1998–99 FA Premier League (known as the FA Carling Premiership for sponsorship reasons) was the seventh season of the Premier League, the top division of English football, since its establishment in 1992. Manchester United won a unique treble of the league title, the FA Cup and the UEFA Champions League. They secured their fifth league title in seven seasons after outlasting Arsenal and Chelsea in a closely fought title race, losing just three league games all season.

The season was also the 100th season of top flight football in England, not counting years lost to the two World Wars. Of the original clubs in the first Football League season, only Aston Villa, Blackburn Rovers, Derby County and Everton were present for this season. 

Arsenal failed to retain their title, despite having the same points tally as last season 78 points, but had at one point looked as though they were on the brink of winning the title, after beating fellow rivals Tottenham Hotspur, while Manchester United had drawn against Liverpool, 2–2. However, Manchester United pushed on and took advantage of Arsenal's 1–0 defeat at Leeds United in the penultimate match of the season and despite going 1–0 down against Tottenham on the final day, came back to win 2–1 and clinch the title. Should they have failed to win, Arsenal would have been crowned champions once more.

Chelsea, looking to build on a fourth-placed finish the previous season, were flying for much of the season and were in a good position to claim a first league title in 44 years. The Blues were second at Christmas and went top on Boxing Day. A loss at Highbury at the start of February was just a second in the league all season, and kept Chelsea in second place, just a point off the summit. Eventually, three draws in April against winnable opposition (mid-table sides Middlesbrough and Leicester City, and relegation-threatened Sheffield Wednesday) is what cost Chelsea a first Premiership crown. Had they won these, the Blues would've been champions. Chelsea had to settle for third place, earning a maiden Champions League appearance.

To achieve their success, the Manchester United playing squad had been altered substantially during the close season. A total of more than £28 million had been spent on Dwight Yorke, Jaap Stam and Jesper Blomqvist, while several older players left the club; Gary Pallister returned to Middlesbrough after nine years for £2.5 million, while Brian McClair returned to Motherwell on a free transfer. In December, however, McClair was back in the Premier League as Brian Kidd's assistant at Blackburn Rovers.

Season summary
At the end of 1998–99, the Premiership would have three Champions League places. Manchester United as well as runners-up Arsenal and third placed Chelsea would be playing in the following season's Champions League. There would only be one automatic UEFA Cup place from the league – taken by fourth-placed Leeds United. Fifth-placed West Ham United qualified for the UEFA Cup via the Intertoto Cup after achieving their highest league finish for thirteen years as they continued to make progress under Harry Redknapp, outperforming several "bigger" clubs with greater resources. Also qualifying were Newcastle United via the 1998–99 FA Cup final, and Tottenham Hotspur via the League Cup.

Bottom of the Premiership in the final table came Nottingham Forest, who suffered their third relegation in seven seasons. One notable low for Forest this season was an 8–1 drubbing at home, by Manchester United. Second from bottom came Blackburn Rovers, who just four seasons earlier had been Premiership champions. The final relegation place went to Charlton Athletic, who went down at the end of their first spell in the top flight for nine seasons. The only newly promoted club to survive was Middlesbrough, who finished in a respectable ninth place.

None of the teams relegated from the Premiership the previous season regained their top division status in 1999, although First Division champions Sunderland regained their Premiership place after a two-year exile. The other two relegation places went to long-term absentees from the top division. Playoff winners Watford regained their top division place after an absence of 11 years, but runners-up Bradford had been outside of the top division for 77 years. These two promotion winners surprised the observers more than any other Division One side during 1998–99.

Teams
Twenty teams competed in the league – the top seventeen teams from the previous season and the three teams promoted from the First Division. The promoted teams were Nottingham Forest, Middlesbrough (both teams sealing an immediate return to the top flight) and Charlton Athletic (playing in the top flight after an eight-year absence). This was also Charlton Athletic's first season in the Premier League. They replaced Bolton Wanderers, Barnsley and Crystal Palace, with all three relegated teams immediately returning to the First Division after a mere season's presence.

Stadiums and locations

Personnel and kits
(as of 16 May 1999)

Managerial changes

League table

Results

Season statistics

Scoring

Top scorers

Hat-tricks 

Note: 4 Player scored 4 goals; P Player scored a perfect hat-trick;  Player scored hat-trick as a substitute; (H) – Home; (A) – Away

Top assists

Awards

Monthly awards

Annual awards

Notes

External links
1998–99 FA Premier League Season at RSSSF

 
Premier League seasons
Eng
1